Mostyn Yanto Ffrench-Williams (12 October 1914 – 11 November 1963) was an English competition swimmer and backstroke swimmer who represented Great Britain at the Olympics, and swam for England at the British Empire Games, during the 1930s.  Ffrench-Williams competed in freestyle and backstroke swimming events.

He was born in London.

In the 1932 Summer Olympics, he finished fifth with the British team in the 4×200-metre freestyle relay event. In the 100-metre freestyle competition he was eliminated in the first round.

Four years later the 1936 Summer Olympics in Berlin, he was a member of the British team which finished sixth with the British team in the 4×200-metre freestyle relay contest at the 1936 Games. He also swam in the 100-metre freestyle event but was eliminated in the first round again.

At the 1934 British Empire Games in London, he was a member of the English team which won the silver medal in the 4×200-yard freestyle competition. In the 3×110-yard medley contest he won a bronze medal with the English team.  Four years later at the 1938 Empire Games in Sydney, he was part of the English team which won the gold medal in the 4×220-yard freestyle event. In Sydney he also participated in the backstroke competition.

See also
 List of Commonwealth Games medallists in swimming (men)

External links
Mostyn Ffrench-Williams' profile at Sports Reference.com

1914 births
1963 deaths
English male freestyle swimmers
Olympic swimmers of Great Britain
Swimmers at the 1932 Summer Olympics
Swimmers at the 1936 Summer Olympics
Swimmers at the 1934 British Empire Games
Swimmers at the 1938 British Empire Games
Commonwealth Games gold medallists for England
Commonwealth Games silver medallists for England
Commonwealth Games bronze medallists for England
Commonwealth Games medallists in swimming
Medallists at the 1934 British Empire Games
Medallists at the 1938 British Empire Games